Karakert is a village in the Armavir Province of Armenia. Population is 4757.

See also 
Armavir Province

References 

World Gazeteer: Armenia – World-Gazetteer.com

Populated places in Armavir Province